Henderson Hill is a subzone within the planning area of Bukit Merah, Singapore, as defined by the Urban Redevelopment Authority (URA). Its boundary is composed of Alexandra Road in the north; Lower Delta Road in the east; Jalan Bukit Merah in the south; and the residential precinct along Redhill Close in the east.

References

Bukit Merah
Central Region, Singapore